Roberto Colombo (born 24 August 1975) is an Italian former professional football goalkeeper.

Football career

Early career
Colombo was the product of A.C. Milan youth rank. He was on loan to Valdagno (Serie C2), Fiorenzuola (Serie C1), Solbiatese (Serie C2) and Monza (Serie B), before joining Milan's first team at the first half of 1999–00 season.

Padova
In January 2000, he joined Calcio Padova (Serie C2). He helped the club promote to Serie C1 in summer 2001, but the following season he made only one appearance. He became the first choice goalkeeper again in summer 2003.

He played 126 league games for the club, before joining San Marino Calcio (Serie C1). In San Marino, he just missed one Serie C1 game, out of 34 (plus two relegation playoff ties).

Bologna
Since the departure of Gianluca Pagliuca and Emanuele Manitta, Colombo and Francesco Antonioli were signed by Bologna as backup and first choice keepers respectively.

In May 2010, at the end of Serie A season, he was borrowed by A.C. Milan for a club friendly against D.C. United.

Triestina
In August 2010 he signed a one-year contract as first choice keeper with Triestina .

Napoli
In July 2010 he signed with Serie A side Napoli .

Cagliari
In January 2015 he joined Cagliari as a third-choice keeper.

Honours
Napoli
Coppa Italia: 2011–12, 2013–14
Supercoppa Italiana: 2014

References

External links
 Profile at La Gazzetta dello Sport (2006–07) 

1975 births
Living people
Sportspeople from Monza
Italian footballers
Italy youth international footballers
Association football goalkeepers
Serie A players
Serie B players
Serie C players
A.C. Milan players
U.S. Fiorenzuola 1922 S.S. players
A.C. Monza players
Calcio Padova players
Bologna F.C. 1909 players
A.S.D. Victor San Marino players
U.S. Triestina Calcio 1918 players
S.S.C. Napoli players
Cagliari Calcio players
Footballers from Lombardy